The New Zealand Women's Volleyball League is the major national volleyball competition for women in New Zealand, established in 1968. It is organized by New Zealand Volleyball Federation (VNZ).

History
In the 2019/20 season, 9 teams has participated in a three Groups A, B, C the best 4 placed teams overall had qualified to the final four: Waikato, Canterbury, Harbour and Otago, The championship title was won by Harbor Raiders who beat Otago team by a 3:0 score single match.

Winners list

References

External links
New Zealand Volleyball Federation 
  New Zealand Championship. women.volleybox.net 

 

New Zealand Women's Volleyball League
Volleyball in New Zealand
News Zealand Women's Volleyball League